Bruno Caliciuri (born 28 June 1968), better known as Cali, is a French singer-songwriter.

Biography 
Cali was born 28 June 1968 in Perpignan to an Italian father and Catalan mother. He grew up in Vernet-les-Bains. A fan of English rock and French chanson during his youth, Cali was also a keen rugby player. He played for his region and Perpignan (USAP). Inspired by a U2 concert in 1984, Cali devoted himself more to music and less to rugby.

At the age of 17, Cali discovered punk music in Ireland. This was the style of his first group Pénétration anale. His second group was composed of friends from Vernet-les-Bains, and called Les Rebelles. From 25 to 28, Cali self-produced two albums with the band Indy, then was part of Tom Scarlett, where he worked with his past guitarist Hugo Baretge. At the end of 2001, Cali stopped work with Tom record company Labels, which signed him on. At the end of 2003, he released his first well-known solo album L'amour parfait. Regarded as a critical success, the album made him known amongst the premier French artists. Popular songs from the album include "Elle m'a dit", the single "C'est quand le bonheur" and "Pensons à l'avenir".

In October 2005, Cali released his second solo album Menteur. This album reinforced his position amongst France's most popular artists. Popular songs include "Je ne vivrai pas sans toi" and the single "Je m'en vais 
(après Miossec)".

In 2006, he published "Le bordel magnifique" which was recorded during his Menteur tour in Zénith de Lille. It witnesses the connection established between the singer and his audience through the concert.

In 2007, he did a Take-Away Show video session shot by Vincent Moon.

In 2007, he went on a support tour for all the producers of cheese pies hard hit by the crisis that raged that year in the cheese industry, thanks to which he was inducted Chevalier du Camembert Doré and Grand Maître de l'Emmental.

In 2008, he released his third solo album "L'espoir" which was recorded in the South of France with the help of [Mathias Malzieu] and [Scott Colburn]. He expressed his penchant for love stories, but also his political engagement in "Résistance" and the single "1000 coeurs debout"

In 2010 he got prankster Rémi Gaillard to make the clip for his song "L'amour fou".

He currently lives in Languedoc-Roussillon with his two children.

Music 

Cali's musical style is pop/rock. He is accompanied usually by a rock trio (guitar, drums, bass) but often also a violin, saxophone, trumpet and even trombone (for songs like "Tes Yeux"), giving his music a unique almost folk/jazz feel. Cali accompanies himself sometimes with acoustic guitar. On stage, he is known for injecting much passion and energy into his performances. He will often perform a stage dive towards the end of his set, which in at least four instances led to serious injuries.

Awards 
He was nominated for the Breakthrough Artist of the Year award at the 2003 edition of the Victoires de la musique – France's version of the Grammys. In 2004 he was nominated for Male Artist/Group of the Year, Song of the Year for "Pensons à l'avenir" and Concert/Show of the Year for his concert at the Bataclan.

Discography

Albums
Studio albums

Live albums

Singles

Others

DVDs
2004: Pleine de vie - Recorded at the Bataclan

Soundtracks

References

External links 

Official Site 

1968 births
Living people
People from Perpignan
French male singers
French singer-songwriters
French people of Italian descent
French people of Catalan descent
French male singer-songwriters